By the Light of the Silvery Moon may refer to:
"By the Light of the Silvery Moon" (song), a 1909 popular song 
By the Light of the Silvery Moon (film), a 1953 musical film starring Doris Day
By the Light of the Silvery Moon (album), the 1953 soundtrack album for the film

See also
By the Light of the Moon (disambiguation)